Ove Vilhelm Paulsen (22 March 1874 – 29 April 1947) was a Danish botanist.

Biography
Paulsen was born at Aarhus,  Denmark.
He studied at the University of Copenhagen under professor Eugen Warming (1841-1924). 

Paulsen was a keeper at the Botanical Museum of the University of Copenhagen from 1905 to 1920, when he became professor of botany at the Pharmaceutical College in Copenhagen, a position he held until 1947. He studied the flora of Denmark, plankton of the North Atlantic and the flora of Central Asia. He went on expeditions to Northern Persia and Pamir as early as 1898–1899. During his travels through Pamir, he was accompanied by the Danish explorer Ole Olufsen (1865–1929).

Ove Paulsen visited North America with the second International Phytogeographic Excursion from July to September 1913 and subsequently described the biome zonation from east to west in a paper.

The plant species Kali paulsenii is among the many plant taxa named for him.

Selected scientific works
 Børgesen, F. & Paulsen, O. (1898) Om Vegetationen paa de dansk-vestindiske Øer. København: Nordisk Forlag. 114 s. French edition 1900: La végétation des Antilles Danoises en francais par Mlle S.Eriksson. See notes under Børgesen.
 Ostenfeld, C.H. & Ove Paulsen (1910-1911) Marine plankton from the East-Greenland Sea (W. of 6° W. Long, and N. of 73° 30’ N. Lat.): collected by the "Danmark-Expedition" 1906–1908. Meddelelser om Grønland bd. 43 (11).
I : List of diatoms and flagellates / by C.H. Ostenfeld. 1910 
II : Protozoa / by C.H. Ostenfeld. 1910
III : Peridiniales / by Ove Paulsen. 1910 
IV : General remarks on the microplankton / by C.H. Ostenfeld and Ove Paulsen. 1911
 Paulsen, O. (1949) Observations on Dinoflagellates. (edited by J. Grøntved). Biologiske Skrifter / Kongelige Danske Videnskabernes Selskab 6 (4): 1-67.

References

Works on Ove Paulsen 
Steemann Nielsen, E. (1949) Obituary in ICES Journal of Marine Science Vol. 16 (1): 14-15.
Jessen, Knud (1947) Ove Vilhelm Paulsen 22. marts 1874 - 29. April 1947. Botanisk Tidsskrift vol. 48.

20th-century Danish botanists
Danish marine biologists
Danish phycologists
Botanists with author abbreviations
Botanists active in the Arctic
Botanists active in Central Asia
Danish science writers
Academic staff of the University of Copenhagen
University of Copenhagen alumni
1947 deaths
1874 births
People from Aarhus